The 2022–23 Lebanese Premier League is the 61st season of the Lebanese Premier League, the top Lebanese professional league for association football clubs since its establishment in 1934. The league started on 2 September 2022, and will end on 12 March 2023.

It is the third season to feature a "split" format, following its introduction in the 2020–21 season, in which the season is divided into two phases.

Summary

Regulations 
Each club has to involve two players under the age of 21 for at least 2,000 combined minutes, and three players for 3,000 combined minutes. Also, each club is allowed a maximum of eight players over the age of 30, with only five being able to be fielded in a game. In case a club is to not meet the required number of minutes at the end of the season, they will have three points deducted from their total in the league.

For the first time since the cancelled 2019–20 season, each club will be able to have three foreign players under contract.

Format 
Following its introduction in the 2020–21 season, the 2022–23 season consists of two phases: in the first phase, each team plays against one another once. In the second phase, the 12 teams will be divided into two groups based on their position in the first phase. Contrary to the previous season, the teams will only carry over half of their point tally from the first phase. After the first phase is completed, clubs can not move out of their own half in the league, even if they achieve more or fewer points than a higher or lower ranked team, respectively.

The top six teams will play against each other twice; the champion will automatically qualify to the 2023–24 AFC Champions League qualifying play-offs—assuming they meet the criteria set by the Asian Football Confederation (AFC). The runners-up instead will directly qualify to the 2023–24 AFC Cup group stage—as long as the champions meet the AFC criteria for the AFC Champions League. The bottom six teams will also play against each other twice, with the bottom two teams being relegated to the Lebanese Second Division.

Teams 

Twelve teams are competing in the league – the top ten teams from the 2021–22 Lebanese Premier League season and the two teams promoted from the Lebanese Second Division.

Stadiums and locations 

Prior to the start of each season, every team chose two stadiums as their home venues. In case both stadiums were unavailable for a certain matchday, another venue was used.

Note: Table lists in alphabetical order.

Foreign players 
Lebanese clubs are allowed to have three foreign players at their disposal at any time, as well as two extra Palestinian players born in Lebanon in a given match sheet (both of whom can not be fielded at the same time in a match). Moreover, each club competing in an AFC competition is allowed to field one extra foreign player, to be only played in continental matches, as the AFC allows four foreign players to play in the starting eleven (one of whom from an AFC country).

 Players in bold have been registered during the mid-season transfer window.
 Players in italics have left the club during the mid-season transfer window.

League table

Season statistics

Top goalscorers

Most assists

Hat-tricks

Notes

References

External links 

 

Lebanese Premier League seasons
Lebanon
1
Current association football seasons